Los Olvidados ("The Forgotten Ones") is a 1950 Mexican film directed by Luis Buñuel.

Los Olvidados may also refer to:

 Los Olvidados, an American skate punk band that became Drunk Injuns
 Los Olvidados, art work by Esteban Villa
 Los Olvidados, 1997 album by Los Muertos de Cristo
 "Los Olvidados", track on Fire Music (Archie Shepp album) (1965)
 "Los Olvidados", track on album Volumen 5 by  Los Fabulosos Cadillacs (1990)
 "Los Olvidados", episode of Spanish news show Salvados about the 2006 Valencia Metro derailment
 Palacio de los Olvidados ("Palace of the Forgotten"), a museum in Granada, Spain
 Los olvidados de Filipinas, 2005 novel by Lorenzo Mediano